This list of museums in Nova Scotia, Canada contains museums which are defined for this context as institutions (including nonprofit organizations, government entities, and private businesses) that collect and care for objects of cultural, artistic, scientific, or historical interest and make their collections or related exhibits available for public viewing. Also included are non-profit art galleries and university art galleries.  Museums that exist only in cyberspace (i.e., virtual museums) are not included.

See also
Nature centres in Nova Scotia

Defunct museums
 Bras d'Or Lakes & Watershed Interpretive Centre, Baddeck, closed in 2014
 Wild Blueberry & Maple Centre, Oxford (closed 2009)

References

 Association of Nova Scotia Museums
 Nova Scotia's Heritage

External links 
 

 
Nova Scotia
Museums